William Eccles may refer to:
 William Eccles (physicist) (1875–1966), British physicist and pioneer in the development of radio communication
 William Eccles (MP) (1794–1853), British Radical politician
 William Eccles (cricketer) (1838–1900), English cricketer, cricket administrator and British Army officer
 William J. Eccles (1917–1998), historian of Canada